How to Destroy a Relationship is the second album released by London rock group The Servant. It was released in Italy, France, and Switzerland on October 2, 2006.

The producer was Jim Lowe, who produced albums by Stereophonics and The Charlatans.

Confirmed titles
 "How to Destroy a Relationship" - 3:34
 "Sleep Deprivation" - 3:43
 "Hey Lou Reed" - 4:10
 "Save Me Now" - 3:57
 "Moonbeams" - 3:41
 "Brains" - 4:32
 "Hey Do You Feel Good?" - 4:47
 "(I Should Be Your) Girlfriend" - 3:50
 "I Wish I Could Stop Wishing for Things" - 3:19
 "On Your Knees Kid" - 4:23
 "Out of Phase" - 3:26

Singles
 "How To Destroy a Relationship" (2006)
 "(I Should Be Your) Girlfriend" (2006)
 "Hey Lou Reed" (2007)

References

2006 albums
The Servant (band) albums